V1059 Sagittarii (also called Nova Sagittarii 1898) was a nova, which lit up in 1898 in the constellation Sagittarius. The star reached apparent magnitude 4.5, making it easily visible to the naked eye. It was discovered on 8 March 1898, by Williamina Fleming on a photographic plate taken at the Harvard College Observatory.  The discovery plate was an objective prism plate, part of the Henry Draper Memorial Photographs, and Ms Fleming identified it as a nova based on its spectral characteristics.

The astronomical literature contains a variety of values for V1059 Sagittarii's peak brightness. Özdönmez et al. list the peak magnitude as 2.0 (visual), while Downes et al. report a much fainter value of magnitude 4.9 (photographic). Novae are usually classified as "fast" or "slow" based on the time it takes the star to drop from peak brightness by more than 3 magnitudes (T3), but for this nova the decline from maximum was poorly observed, and no T3 value has been reported. Nonetheless, it is classified as a fast nova. Vogt et al. monitored the quiescent nova 116 years after the nova event, and saw minor (0.5 to 0.8 magnitude) variations occurring at irregular intervals, similar to low amplitude dwarf nova outbursts.

All novae are binary stars, with a "donor" star orbiting a white dwarf. The two stars are so close to each other that matter is transferred from the donor to the white dwarf. In the case of V1059 Sagittarii, pair's orbital period is 6.866±0.017 hours.

References

External links

Novae
Sagittarius (constellation)
1898 in science
Sagittarii, V1059
176654
J19015056-1309420